Komaitrochus is a genus of sea snails, marine gastropod mollusks in the family Trochidae, the top snails.

Species
 Komaitrochus pulcher Kuroda, T. & I. Taki in Kuroda, T., 1958

References

External links
 To World Register of Marine Species
 

 
Trochidae
Monotypic gastropod genera